Stacey Sher (born November 30, 1962) is an American film producer.

Early life 
Sher was born to a Jewish family in New York City and raised in Fort Lauderdale, Florida. She graduated and got her bachelor's degree from University of Southern California (USC)  and was involved with the Peter Stark Producing Program which is a two-year (four-semester) full-time graduate program designed to prepare students for careers as producers.
During her early start in the industry, she was in a brief relationship with Quentin Tarantino during the early 1990s. Soon after, she married Kerry P. Brown, a movie soundtrack producer. They have two children.

Career 
In 1985, she became director of development at Hill/Obst Productions. In 1987, she became Vice President of Production. In 1991, she became Senior Vice President at Lynda Obst Productions. She went on to work with Danny DeVito and Michael Shamberg at Jersey Films, and now operates Double Feature Films with Michael Shamberg, with whom she co-founded the company. Stacey Sher has worked on many different movies since the 1980s Movies such as Django Unchained, the Hateful Eight, and Pulp Fiction. She got credibility for the 2005 Independent Spirit Award-winning Garden State, and three films with director Steven Soderbergh: Contagion, Erin Brockovich, and Out of Sight. Additional credits include Oliver Stone's World Trade Center; Matilda; Along Came Polly and many more. Her production company is Shiny Penny Productions.

Sher has worked with multiple high-profile directors, including Terry Gilliam, Richard LaGravenese, Miloš Forman, Zach Braff, Oliver Stone, and has worked on multiple films with Quentin Tarantino,  Steven Soderbergh and Danny DeVito

Sher has worked with many of different notable Hollywood actors and producers as well. She has a close work relationship with Danny DeVito. Both Sher and DeVito have produced movies together, but have also produced television shows together such as Reno 911! and Kate Brasher. Sher was not just working with him but she was also involved as an executive producer on The American Embassy, UC: Undercover, Into the Badlands, Sweet/Vicious, and Skylanders Academy. In the television series Reno 911!, most of the acting is actually improvised. The cast is given a broad outline with minimal script while the rest is improv. She produces all different types of genres.

Sher dated director Quentin Tarantino, but their relationship ended during the development of Pulp Fiction, which Sher was a producer on. Sher married musician/producer Kerry Brown in 2001. They have two children.

Sher has been named co-president of Activision Blizzard Studios. which is devoted to creating television and films based on the company's library of intellectual properties, including Activision Publishing Call of Duty and Skylanders. According to AMC, Sher is a member of the Producers Guild of America, and the Academy of Television Arts & Sciences. Sher was also honored by the ACLU for her commitment to films and television that are empowering, inspirational, and thought-provoking, dealing with issues from public safety to education, social justice to censorship.

In June 2021, Sher had signed an overall deal with FX Productions.

Filmography
She was a producer in all films unless otherwise noted.

Film

As an actress

Thanks

Television

References

External links

1962 births
Film producers from New York (state)
Living people
American women film producers
USC School of Cinematic Arts alumni
Businesspeople from New York City
Businesspeople from Fort Lauderdale, Florida
Television producers from New York City
American women television producers
Film producers from Florida
Television producers from Florida
21st-century American women